Banadkuk-e Dizeh (also Romanized as Banādkūk-e Dīzeh; also known as Banādk-e Dīzeh, Banad Kook, and Banādkūk) is a village in Banadkuk Rural District of Nir District of Taft County, Yazd province, Iran. At the 2006 National Census, its population was 1,535 in 483 households. The following census in 2011 counted 1,227 people in 440 households. The latest census in 2016 showed a population of 1,227 people in 440 households; it was the largest village in its rural district.

References 

Taft County

Populated places in Yazd Province

Populated places in Taft County